William Theophilus Dortch (August 23, 1824 – November 21, 1889) was an American politician who served as a Confederate States senator from North Carolina from 1862 to 1865.

Early life
Dortch was born August 23, 1824 to William Dortch and his wife, Drusilla at his father's plantation, situated in Nash County, North Carolina about 5 miles from the town of Rocky Mount, North Carolina.

Political career
Dortch was a member of the North Carolina General Assembly from 1852 to 1861. In 1860 Dortch served as Speaker of the House of Commons. During the Civil War, Dortch served as a senator from North Carolina in the First Confederate Congress and the Second Confederate Congress (from 1862 to 1865). During his term, Dortch was accused of sexual improprieties with a minor, but was exonerated after an investigation. After the war, he again served in the legislature, first in the North Carolina House of Representatives, and then in the North Carolina Senate from 1879 to 1885. He was President pro tempore of that body from 1881 to 1883.

Death
Dortch died November 21, 1889 in Goldsboro, North Carolina and was buried in Willow Dale Cemetery.

Personal life
Dortch married Elizabeth Pittman of Edgecombe County, North Carolina, they had seven children.  Dortch later married Hattie Williams of Berryville, Virginia, they had four children.

Notes
 bio

References

External links
North Carolina Historical Marker

|-

|-

1824 births
1889 deaths
Confederate States of America senators
19th-century American politicians
Members of the North Carolina House of Representatives
North Carolina state senators
People from Rocky Mount, North Carolina
People of North Carolina in the American Civil War